William Henry Marshall (February 14, 1911 – May 5, 1977) was an American professional baseball second baseman. He batted and threw right-handed. Marshall played seven games in Major League Baseball: one for the Boston Red Sox in 1931 and six for the Cincinnati Reds in 1934. In 1931, he was the fourth youngest player in the American League. After retiring as a player, Marshall scouted for the Boston and Milwaukee Braves, the San Francisco Giants, and the Seattle Pilots.

References

External links

Baseball players from Boston
Major League Baseball second basemen
Boston Red Sox players
Boston Braves scouts
Milwaukee Braves scouts
Seattle Pilots scouts
1911 births
1977 deaths
People from Dorchester, Massachusetts